Maloney is a surname of Irish origin. The name 'Maloney' is derived from the Irish Ó Maoldhomhnaigh. The surname is a sept of an Irish clan Dál gCais who were a powerful group in Ireland during the 10th century.

The name may refer to:

Persons
Brian Maloney, Irish Gaelic football player
Carolyn B. Maloney (born 1948), American politician from New York; U.S. representative
Charles Garrett Maloney (1913–2006), American Roman Catholic bishop in Louisville, Kentucky
Christopher Maloney (born 1969), American bass player, guitarist, singer and music educator
Dan Maloney (born 1950), Canadian professional ice hockey player
Dave Maloney (born 1956), Canadian professional ice hockey player
David Maloney (1933–2006), British television director and producer
David Maloney (musician), of the American folk duo Reilly & Maloney
Don Maloney (1926-2007), American author on Japanese subjects
Don Maloney (born 1958), Canadian professional ice hockey player and manager
Edward Maloney (contemporary), American politician from Illinois; state representative
Edward T. Maloney (contemporary), aviation historian and museum curator
Evan Coyne Maloney (born 1972), American blogger and web chat developer
Francis T. Maloney (1894–1945), American politician from Connecticut; U.S. representative and senator
Frank Maloney, British boxing manager and promoter
Frank Richard Maloney (1945-2009), American writer and poet
Franklin J. Maloney (1899–1958), American politician from Pennsylvania; U.S. representative
Gary Maloney (born 1958), American political consultant
James Maloney (born 1986), Australian Rugby League player
James H. Maloney (born 1948), American politician from Connecticut; U.S. representative
Jack Maloney (born 1994), English professional football player
Jim Maloney (born 1940), American professional baseball player
Joe Maloney (1934–2006), English professional football player
John David Maloney (born 1945), Canadian politician from Ontario; member of the House of Commons
John F. Maloney (died 1918), Alaskan lawyer, businessman, and politician; mayor of Juneau 1905–1906
Julia Faye Maloney (1892–1966), American actress
Kevin P. Maloney (1958), American real estate developer 
Kristen Maloney (born 1981), American Olympic gymnast
Lennard Maloney (born 1999), German-American soccer player
Leo D. Maloney (1885–1929), American actor and director
Martin Maloney (disambiguation)
Matt Maloney (born 1971), American professional basketball player
Matt M. Maloney (business executive), American entrepreneur and business executive (Grubhub)
Michael Maloney (born 1957), English actor
Patty Maloney (born 1936), American actress with dwarfism
Paul H. Maloney (1876–1967), American politician from Louisiana; U.S. representative
Rich Maloney (born c. 1964), American college baseball coach at University of Michigan
Robert S. Maloney (1881–1934), American politician from Massachusetts, U.S. representative
Samantha Maloney (born 1975), American musician and drummer
Seamus Maloney, Australian rules footballer and coach
Sean Patrick Maloney (born 1966), American lawyer and politician from New York; adviser to President Clinton
Shafiqua Maloney (born 1999), Saint Vincent and the Grenadines athlete
Shane Maloney (contemporary), Australian author of the Murray Whelan'' series of novels
Shaun Maloney (born 1983), Scottish footballer
Stephen Maloney (1960–2021), Australian tennis player
Steve Maloney (contemporary), English rock bassist with the band the Blood Divine
Tim Maloney (contemporary), Animator
William F. Maloney, American engineer
William Maloney (politician) (1854–1940), Australian politician from Melbourne; member of the House of Representatives

Other

Maloney, Kentucky
Boulevard Maloney (Gatineau), road in Quebec, Canada
Maloney Elementary School, Fremont, California, USA
Maloney Hall, chemistry building at The Catholic University of America
Maloney House (Lockport, New York), historic home located in Niagara County

See also
Moloney (disambiguation)

References

Surnames of Irish origin